Natalia Orlova (born 29 August 1969, Rubtsovsk, Altai Krai) is a Russian political figure and a deputy of the 8th State Duma. 

In 2004, Orlova was appointed Deputy Head of the Department for Financial and Economic Support of the Central Executive Committee of the All-Russian Political Party United Russia. From 2012 to 2021, she served as the First Deputy Head of the Central Executive Committee of the United Russia Party. She was an authorized representative for financial matters of the candidate for the post of President of the Russian Federation Vladimir Putin in the elections of 2004, 2008, 2012, 2018. Since September 2021, she has served as a deputy of the 8th State Dumas where she joined the Committee for Transport and Development of Transport Infrastructure.

She is one of the members of the State Duma the United States Treasury sanctioned on 24 March 2022 in response to the 2022 Russian invasion of Ukraine.

References

1969 births
Living people
United Russia politicians
21st-century Russian politicians
Eighth convocation members of the State Duma (Russian Federation)
21st-century Russian women politicians
Russian individuals subject to the U.S. Department of the Treasury sanctions
Russian Presidential Academy of National Economy and Public Administration alumni